Hanuman Books was a series of books published between 1986 and 1993 out of the Chelsea Hotel in New York City. Featuring some of the biggest names in avant-garde culture of the time – including figures from Beat poetry, gay and trans culture, Warhol's Factory, San Francisco's North Beach and New York's Lower East Side art scenes, the Naropa Institute, contemporary music and film – the series has since acquired a cult following.

History

Hanuman Books was founded by American art critic and editor Raymond Foye and Italian painter Francesco Clemente in 1986. The name – as well as the striking format – were influenced by Indian prayer books collected on a trip to India in 1985. "The books, small in size and bright in color, were always dedicated to the writings of a particular guru or saint, and were intended to be carried around with ease in a shirt pocket for potential contemplation throughout daily life." The editors elected to publish a series of similarly designed books to showcase contemporary writing, hard-to-find translations, and "exquisite expressions" of poets and artists. They named the press after Hanuman, the Hindu monkey god.

They decided to publish twelve books a year in two batches of six, released in the spring and fall. Foye often chose younger American writers; Clemente sought out works in translation, including René Daumal, Henri Michaux, and Francis Picabia. Hanuman Books also approached well-known writers and visual artists, including John Ashbery, William Burroughs, Willem de Kooning, Allen Ginsberg, and Patti Smith.

The administration and editorial functions were managed by Foye at the Chelsea Hotel in New York City. Clemente was responsible for crafting Hanuman Books logo, and also conceptualised the overall design.

Hanuman books were printed on a letterpress at C.T. Nachiappan's Kalakshetra Press in Madras (now Chennai), India. The pages were sewn together by local fishermen and others. All of the books have the same  dimensions except for René Ricard's God with Revolver, which exceeded the format's limit of twelve thousand words.

George Scrivani, who was the editor at Kalakshetra Press, liaised with Foye via telephone, fax and mail in order to exchange corrections, and then shipped the books by boat from Madras to New York. Indian obscenity laws affected the publication of two books. Cookie Mueller's Fan Mail, Frank Letters and Crank Calls contained a picture of Priapus, a Roman fertility god, which was deemed obscene, and the shipment was held up (though Hanuman Books eventually won the obscenity case, and those books not ruined by customs officials were successfully shipped to New York). Nachiappan himself destroyed the first print-run of Bob Flanagan's Fuck Journal in order to avoid prosecution under anti-obscenity laws, which applied to printers as well as publishers. He was convinced by Foye to print five hundred clandestine copies, however, which were smuggled to the United States.

The books were distributed on an informal basis from the Chelsea Hotel. The editors also employed professional distributors (e.g. Sun and Moon Press in Los Angeles, Small Press Distribution in Berkeley) which placed Hanuman books in bookstores and museums. They were often sold near cash registers because of their unique size, and sold for four or five dollars.

The last Hanuman books were published in 1993.

List of titles

Series I (1-6)
John Wieners, Superficial Estimation
David Trinidad, November
Eileen Myles, Bread and Water
Taylor Mead, Son of Andy Warhol
Francis Picabia, Who Knows
Henri Michaux, By Surprise

Series II (7-12)
Amy Gerstler, Primitive Man
John Ashbery, The Ice Storm
Herbert Huncke, Guilty of Everything
Manuel Rosenthal, Satie, Ravel, Poulenc
René Daumal, A Fundamental Experiment
John Wieners, Conjugal Contraries & Quart

Series III (13-18)
Bob Flanagan, Fuck Journal
Willem de Kooning, Collected Writings
Cookie Mueller, Fan Mail, Frank Letters, and Crank Calls
Sandro Penna, Confused Dream
Vincent Katz, Cabal of Zealots
Alain Danielou, Fools of God

Series IV (19-24)
Edwin Denby, Willem de Kooning
Max Beckmann, On My Painting
Gary Indiana, White Trash Boulevard
Jean Genet, Rembrandt
David Trinidad, Three Stories
Allen Ginsberg, Your Reason and Blake's System

Series V (25-30)
René Guénon, Oriental Metaphysics
Eileen Myles, 1969
Gregory Corso, Mind Field
René Daumal, The Lie of the Truth
Elaine Equi, Views Without Rooms
Ronald Firbank, Firbankiana

Series VI (31-36)
David Hockney, Picasso
St. Teresa/Simone Weil, On the Lord's Prayer
Jack Smith, Historical Treasures
Cookie Mueller, Garden of Ashes
Beauregard Houston-Montgomery, Pouf Pieces
Bob Dylan, Saved! The Gospel Speeches of Bob Dylan

Series VII (37-42)
Richard Hell, Artifact: Notebooks from Hell 1974-1980
Henry Geldzahler, Looking at Pictures
Francis Picabia, Yes No
Robert Creeley, Autobiography
Dodie Bellamy, Feminine Hijinx
Jack Kerouac, Safe in Heaven Dead

Series VIII (43-48)
Candy Darling, Candy Darling
Nick Zedd, Bleed Part One
Patti Smith, Woolgathering
William Burroughs, Painting and Guns
Robert Hunter, Idiot's Delight
Robert Frank, One Hour

Unnumbered
Jack Kerouac, Manhattan Sketches
René Ricard, God with Revolver

Recognition 

"...the Hanuman canon, a publishing endeavor that articulated a new vision of a possible avant-garde lineage in its short life span between 1986 and 1993, linking the energies and efforts of the eighties Lower East Side with threads from earlier poets, painters, musicians, and thinkers. If you were to line up the whole Hanuman pantheon on a shelf chronologically and take a random core sample of a few titles ... you would be mining several distinct trajectories of literature, art, music, and underground culture from the past century."

References

External links 
Hanuman Books archive at the University of Michigan

Book publishing companies of the United States
Companies based in New York City
Series of books